The AMD K5 microprocessor is a Pentium-class 32-bit CPU manufactured by American company Advanced Micro Devices (AMD), and targeted at the consumer market. It was the first x86 processor designed by AMD from the ground up, and not licensed or reverse-engineered as previous generations of x86 processors produced by AMD.

Desktop CPU

K5 (model 0, 500 & 350 nm)
 CPU-ID: 5-0-0, 5-0-1: Part numbers which contain "SSA/5" are 500 and part numbers which contain "K5-PR" are 501
 Transistors: 4.3 million
 Die size: 251 mm²(SSA/5), 161 mm²(K5-PR)
 Manufacturing Processes: 500 nm (SSA/5), 350 nm (K5-PR)

K5 (model 1, 350 nm)
 CPU-ID: 5-1-1
 Transistors: 4.3 million
 Die size: 181 mm²
 This is the first K5 processor family that internally ran at slower speed than its rated speed.

K5 (model 2, 350 nm)
 CPU-ID: 5-2-4
 Transistors: 4.3 million
 Die size: 181 mm²

K5 (model 3, 350 nm)
 CPU-ID: 5-3-4
 Transistors: 4.3 million
 Die size: 181 mm²

See also

 AMD K5
 List of AMD microprocessors
 List of AMD Duron microprocessors
 List of AMD Athlon XP microprocessors
 List of AMD Athlon 64 microprocessors
 List of AMD Athlon X2 microprocessors
 List of AMD Phenom microprocessors
 List of AMD Opteron microprocessors
 List of AMD Sempron microprocessors

External links
 AMD K5 processor families
 AMD K5 Image Gallery 
 AMD K5 Processor info

References

AMD K5